Roger G. Hawkins (October 16, 1945 – May 20, 2021) was an American drummer best known for playing as part of the studio backing band known as the Muscle Shoals Rhythm Section (also known as the Swampers) of Alabama.

Biography
Hawkins's drumming can be heard on dozens of hit singles, including tracks by Percy Sledge ("When a Man Loves a Woman"), Aretha Franklin ("Respect", "I Never Loved a Man (The Way I Love You)" etc.), Wilson Pickett ("Mustang Sally", "Land of 1000 Dances"), The Staple Singers, Johnnie Taylor, Bobby Womack, Clarence Carter, Etta James, Duane Allman, Joe Cocker, Paul Simon, Bob Seger, Bonnie Bramlett, Bobby "Blue" Bland, Boz Scaggs, Albert King, Traffic, Rod Stewart, Dan Penn, Lulu, and Willie Nelson. He also recorded with Eric Clapton in the early 80's.

Hawkins died at age 75 at his home in Sheffield, Alabama. Hawkins had suffered from numerous health problems including chronic obstructive pulmonary disease.

Top 40 US hits

Collaborations 
With Paul Anka
 Feelings (United Artists Records, 1975)

With Patti Austin
 Body Language (CTI Records, 1980)
 In My Life (CTI Records, 1983)

With Joan Baez
 Honest Lullaby (Portrait Records, 1979)

With William Bell
 Wow... (Stax Records, 1971)
 Phases of Reality (Stax Records, 1972)

With Bobby Bland
 Midnight Run (Malaco Records, 1989)
 Portrait of the Blues (Malaco Records, 1991)
 Sad Street (Malaco Records, 1995)
 Blues at Midnight (Malaco Records, 2003)

With Bonnie Bramlett
 Lady's Choice (Capricorn Records, 1976)

With Dee Dee Bridgewater
 Dee Dee Bridgewater (Atlantic Records, 1976)

With Dianne Brooks
 Back Stairs in My Life (Reprise Records, 1976)

With Shirley Brown
 Joy & Pain (Malaco Records, 1993)

With Peabo Bryson
 Peabo (Bullet Records, 1976)

With Jimmy Buffett
 Beach House on the Moon (Island Records, 1999)

With Solomon Burke
 King Solomon (Atlantic Records, 1968)
 Proud Mary (Ola, 1969)

With Billy Burnette
 Gimme You (Columbia Records, 1981)

With J. J. Cale
 Really (A&M Records, 1972)

With Kim Carnes
 Sailin' (A&M Records, 1976)

With Clarence Carter
 This is Clarence Carter (Atlantic Records, 1968)
 Testifyin (Atlantic Records, 1969)
 The Dynamic Clarence Carter (Atlantic Records, 1969)With Beth Nielsen Chapman Hearing It First (Capitol Records, 1980)With Cher 3614 Jackson Highway (Atco Records, 1969)With Eric Clapton Money and Cigarettes (Warner Bros. Records, 1983)With Jimmy Cliff Another Cycle (Island Records, 1971)With Joe Cocker Luxury You Can Afford (Asylum Records, 1978)With Ry Cooder Boomer's Story (Reprise Records, 1972)With Steve Cropper Night After Night (MCA Records, 1982)With Gail Davies The Game (Warner Bros. Records, 1980)With Mink DeVille Sportin' Life (Polydor Records, 1985)With Willy DeVille Horse of a Different Color (EastWest Records, 1999)With José Feliciano 
 Sweet Soul Music (Private Stock Records, 1976)With Eddie Floyd Soul Street (Stax Records, 1974)With Aretha Franklin Aretha Arrives (Rhino Records, 1967)
 Lady Soul (Rhino Records, 1968)
 Aretha Now (Atlantic Records, 1968)
 Soul '69 (Atlantic Records, 1969)
 This Girl's in Love with You (Atlantic Records, 1970)
 Spirit in the Dark (Atlantic Records, 1970)
 Hey Now Hey (The Other Side of the Sky) (Atlantic Records, 1973)With Glenn Frey No Fun Aloud (Asylum Records, 1982)
 Soul Searchin' (MCA Records, 1988)With Art Garfunkel Breakaway (Columbia Records, 1975)
 Watermark (Columbia Records, 1977)With Barry Goldberg Barry Goldberg (Atco Records, 1974)With John P. Hammond Southern Fried (Atlantic Records, 1971)
 Can't Beat the Kid (Capricorn Records, 1975)With Ronnie Hawkins Ronnie Hawkins (Cotillion Records, 1970)With Levon Helm Levon Helm (ABC Records, 1978)
 Levon Helm (Capitol Records, 1982)With Loleatta Holloway Loleatta Holloway (Goldon Mind Records, 1979)
 Love Sensation (Goldon Mind Records, 1980)With Etta James Tell Mama (Cadet Records, 1968)
 Seven Year Itch (Island Records, 1988)
 Stickin' to My Guns (Island Records, 1990)
 The Right Time (Elektra Records, 1992)With Margie Joseph Margie Joseph Make a New Impression (Volt Records, 1971)With Nick Kamen Nick Kamen (WEA, 1987)With Albert King Lovejoy (Stax Records, 1971)With Julian Lennon Valotte (Atlantic Records, 1984)With Lulu New Routes (Atlantic Records, 1970)With Mary MacGregor Torn Between Two Lovers (Ariola Records, 1976)With Lonnie Mack The Hills of Indiana (Elektra Records, 1971)
 Roadhouses and Dance Halls (Epic Records, 1988)With Delbert McClinton Second Wind (Capricorn Records, 1978)
 The Jealous Kind (Capitol Records, 1980)
 Plain from the Heart (Capitol Records, 1981)With Frankie Miller Standing on the Edge (Capitol Records, 1982)With Ronnie Milsap Ronnie Milsap (Warner Bros. Records, 1971)
 Keyed Up (RCA Records, 1983)With Willie Nelson Phases and Stages (Atlantic Records, 1974)With Laura Nyro Christmas and the Beads of Sweat (Columbia Records, 1970)With The Oak Ridge Boys American Made (MCA Records, 1983)
 Deliver (MCA Records, 1983)
 Step On Out (MCA Records, 1985)
 Seasons (MCA Records, 1985)With Dan Penn Nobody's Fool (Bell Records, 1973)
 Do Right Man (Sire Records, 1994)
 Blue Nite Lounge (Dandy Records, 2000)
 Something About the Night (Dandy Records, 2016)With Wilson Pickett The Exciting Wilson Pickett (Atlantic Records, 1966)
 The Wicked Pickett (Atlantic Records, 1967)
 The Sound of Wilson Pickett (Atlantic Records, 1967)
 Hey Jude (Atlantic Records, 1969)
 Right On (Atlantic Records, 1970)
 Don't Knock My Love (Atlantic Records, 1971)
 Funky Situation (Big Tree Records, 1978)With Eddie Rabbitt Loveline (Elektra Records, 1979)With Helen Reddy Take What You Find (Capitol Records, 1980)With Johnny Rivers The Road (Atlantic Records, 1974)
 Borrowed Time (RSO Records, 1980)With Linda Ronstadt Linda Ronstadt (Capitol Records, 1971)With Billy Joe Royal Tell It Like It Is (Atlantic Records, 1989)With Calvin Russell Calvin Russell (Last Call Records, 1997)
 Sam (Last Call Records, 1999)With Leon Russell Leon Russell and the Shelter People (Shelter Records, 1971)With Boz Scaggs Boz Scaggs (Atlantic Records, 1969)
 My Time (Columbia Records, 1972)With Bob Seger Smokin' O.P.'s (Reprise Records, 1972)
 Back in '72 (Reprise Records, 1973)
 Beautiful Loser (Capitol Records, 1975)
 Night Moves (Capitol Records, 1976)
 Stranger in Town (Capitol Records, 1978)
 Against the Wind (Capitol Records, 1980)
 The Distance (Capitol Records, 1982)With Paul Simon There Goes Rhymin' Simon (Columbia Records, 1973)
 Still Crazy After All These Years (Columbia Records, 1975)With Mavis Staples Mavis Staples (Volt Records, 1969)
 Only for the Lonely (Volt Records, 1970)
 Oh What a Feeling (Warner Bros. Records, 1979)With Candi Staton Candi (Warner Bros. Records, 1974)With Cat Stevens Izitso (A&M Records, 1977)With B. W. Stevenson Rainbow Down the Road (Amazing Records, 1990)With Rod Stewart Atlantic Crossing (Warner Bros. Records, 1975)
 A Night on the Town (Warner Bros. Records, 1976)With Billy Swan Four (Columbia Records, 1977)With Keith Sykes The Way That I Feel (Midland Records, 1977)With Traffic Shoot Out at the Fantasy Factory (Island Records, 1973)With Wendy Waldman Gypsy Symphony (Warner Bros. Records, 1974)With Tony Joe White'''
 The Train I'm On (Warner Brothers, 1972)
 Closer to the Truth'' (Festival Records, 1991)

Notes

References

External links
 
  biography at DrummerWorld.com
 
 

1945 births
2021 deaths
People from Mishawaka, Indiana
Musicians from Indiana
American rock drummers
Traffic (band) members
Muscle Shoals Rhythm Section members
Rhythm and blues drummers
American session musicians
Soul drummers
20th-century American drummers
American male drummers
Respiratory disease deaths in Alabama
Deaths from chronic obstructive pulmonary disease